Demirciler (Turkish: "blacksmiths") may refer to:

People
 Alperay Demirciler (born 1993), Turkish volleyball player

Places
 Demirciler, Bayat
 Demirciler, Bolu, a village in the district of Bolu, Bolu Province, Turkey
 Demirciler, Borçka, a village in the district of Borçka, Artvin Province, Turkey
 Demirciler, Dursunbey, a village
 Demirciler, Kale
 Demirciler, İvrindi, a village
 Demirciler, Manavgat, a village in the district of Manavgat, Antalya Province, Turkey
 Demirciler, Mengen, a village in the district of Mengen, Bolu Province, Turkey
 Demirciler, Nazilli, a village in the district of Nazilli, Aydın Province, Turkey
 Demirciler, Serik, a village in the district of Serik, Antalya Province, Turkey

See also
 Dəmirçilər (disambiguation)
 Demirci (disambiguation)
 Dəmirçi (disambiguation)